Gammel Strand 40 is a Neoclassical property overlooking Slotsholmen Canal in the Olt Town of Copenhagen, Denmark. The building was listed in the Danish registry of protected buildings and places in 1945. A commemorative plaque above the doorway commemorates that Georg Carstensen, founder of Tivoli Gardens, was a resident in the building when his amusement park opened in 1843.

History

17th and 18th centuries

The property was listed as No. 11 in Strand Quarter in Copenhagen's first cadastre of 1689. It was at that time owned by wine seller (vintapper) Evert Funch.

The property was later acquired by the Jewish court medallist Aron Jacobse. His property was listed as No. 11 in the new cadastreof 1756. The property was after Ahron Jacobsen's death passed down to his sons David and Solomon Jacobsen. They had both followed in their father's footsteps as court medallists.

 
No. 11 was home to seven households at the time of the 1787 census. Salomon Ahron Jacobson resided in the building with his wife Inerlo, their three children (aged three to eight), a maid and a caretaker. David Jacobsen resided in the building with his wife Billa, their four children (aged three to seven) and two maids. Fridericha, a widow, resided in the building with her son Levin.
 Salomon Amsel Meyer. a Jewish merchant, resided in the building with his wife Hanne Goldschmidt, their four-year-old son Jacob and one maid. Christian Grolo, a Lottery collector, resided in the building with his wife Cathrine Marie Schwierman, their one-year-old daughter Marie Anne and one maid. Gert Nielssen Dyrberg, a restaurateur ("roaster"), resided in the basement with his wife Gertru Ols Datter and their two children (aged 11 and 12). Maren Berg, a junk dealer, was also a resident of the building.

Salomon Jacobsen moved to Altona a few years later, leaving his younger brother as the sole owner of the property in Copenhagen.

The property was destroyed in the Copenhagen Fire of 1795, together with most of the other buildings in the area. The present building on the site was constructed in 1799–1801 for court engraver David Ahron Jacobsen. The narrow courtyard was originally divided in two by a warehouse but it was demolished in 1958.

19th century
Jacobsen's property was home to 19 residents in three households at the time of the 1801 census. David Aron Jacobsen resided in the building with his second wife Bellou (bnée Meyer), their four children (aged seven to 21) and one maid. Julius Friderich Ludvig Count Rantzau (1770-1820), a count, resided in the building with his wife Elisabeth (née de Windt, 1769–1832), two male servants and three maids. Otte Didrich Lutken Agerbeck (1747-1806), a captain in the Danish Asiatic Company and qalderman of the Pilot's Guild in Copenhagen, resided in the building with his wife Johanne Brache (née Schumacher), a housekeeper and a maid.

The property was listed as No. 10 in the new cadastre of 1806. It was at that time still owned by Jacobsen. He died on 12 December 1812 and was buried in the Hewish Cemetery in Møllegade.

In 1817, No. 10 was merged with No. 22B as No. 11 & 22 B.  The archeologist Peter Oluf Brøndsted was from 1815 to 1818 a resident in the building.

The building in Læderstræde was home to 32 residents in  six households at the time of the 1840 census. Hendrik Eskild Schierning (1799-), owner of the property, resided on the second floor with his wife Dorthea Sophie Svalberg, their three sons (aged 16 to 20), two lodgers and one maid. One of the two lodgers was pupil at the Royal Danish Theatre Gunder Emanuel Gundersen (1817-1880). The other lodger was pharmacy pupil Matthias Johann Riemenschneider. Johan Hen. William Prosch (-1843), a French teacher with title of  overkrigskommissær, resided on the ground floor with his French-born  wife Caroline Sophie (née Brément) and their three children (aged 13 to 21). John Erik Leerbech (1805-1860), a police officer (politiadjudant), resided on the first floor with his wife Frederikke Lovise Leerbech (née Michaelsen, 1688–873) and one maid. Christian Jacob Nikolaj Westerholt (1790-1858(an army major now employed in the Office for State Debt (Statsgældskontoret), resided in the ground floor with his wife Sophie Hedevig Helene Christiane Buch (1790-1857), their three children (aged 20 to 26), the lodger Ludvig Gotschalk(student) and one maid. Hans Jørgen Ahrentz, a master plumber, resided in the building with his wife Calote Amali Ahrentz, their two children (aged sic and nine), one apprentice and one maid. Christen Sørensen and Anders Christian Christensen, two male servants, resided in the garret. The building on Gammel Strand was home to 42 residents in five households. Cornelius Hansen, a restaurateur, resided on the ground floor with his wife Christiane Hansen født Nielsen, their four children (aged two to 10), two students, a housekeeper (husjomfru) and four maids. Levin Benjamin Holländer, a merchant (grosserer), resided on the first floor with his wife Minne Holländer født Heckscher, four of their children (aged 10 to 30), an employee in the trading firm and one maid. Johannes Hjort Ussing, a civil servant in Overformynderiet's 3rd office, resided on the second floor with his wife Werner Jasper Andreas Ussing, their four children (aged 10 to 20), a housekeeper (husjomfru) and a maid. One of the four children was the later jurist and politician Werner Ussing (1818-1873). and another one was the later filologist and archeologist Johan Louis Ussing (1820-1905=.  Johannes Nicolai Henrich Wilkens, a high-ranking official in the Bank of Denmark with title of kancelliråd, resided on the third floor with his wife Johanne Wilkens, four of their children (aged 11 to 30) and two maids. Ole Rasmussen, a runner at Prince Ferdinand's court, resided in the basement with his wife Kirstine Sisse Sørensen, their two children (aged three and six) and one maid.

Georg Carstensen, founder of Tivoli Gardens, had just moved into one of the apartments when his amusement park opened in 1843,

Gammel Strand 11 was home to 39 residents  six households at the 1845 census. Johan Christian Prydz Hansen, a businessman )handelsfuldmægtig), resided on the ground floor wityh his wife Henriette Emilie (mée Krabbe), their five-year-old daughter Julie Amalie Christiane, his sister-in-law Lorentze Nicoline Krabbe, three lodgers and one maid. Georg Carstensen resided in the first floor apartment with one maid. Peter Larcher, a solo dancer at the Royal Danish Ballet, resided on the second floor with his wife Cicilie Larcher, their four children (aged two to 14), lodger Johanne Marie Kierulf and three maids. Niels Georg Brasin, a Candidate of Philosophy, resided alone on the third floor. O. Rasmussen, the proprietor of a tavern in the basement, resided in the associated dwelling with his wife Sisse Cristina Sørensen, their two children (aged seven and 10), four male servants and two maids. H. Schjerning, the owner of the property, resided on a mezzanine (indskudt etage), with his wife Dorthea Sophie Schjerning, their 20-year-old son Cand Emil Schjerning, the art student Johan Peter Molin, one male servant, two male servants and one a caretajer.

Jacob Davidsen (1813–1891),  a writer and editorial secretary of Flyveposten, was among the resident in 1850. Peter Faber, inspector at the College of Advanced Technology, was a resident from 1850 to 1858.

The property was home to 26 residents in five households  at the time of the 1860 census. Julius Karl Levym a merchant, resided on the ground floor with his wife Julie Levy	and one maid. James Petersen, another merchant, resided on the first floor with his wife Johanne Kirstine Petersen, their two children (aged six and eight), a governess and a maid. Georg Ogilev Meyer, a third merchant, resided on the second floor with his wife Antoinette Josephine Meyer, their two-year-old daughter and two maids. Christian Albert Frederik Thomsen, a captain in Generalstaben, resided on the third floor with his wife Thora Michella Thomsen and one maid. Carl Ludvig Theobald Clemmensen, a 21-year-old bookbinder, resided in the garret. Niels Christistian Hansen, proprietor of a tavern in the basement, resided in the associated dwelling with his wife Maren Christine, their three children (aged five to 13),  the 75-year-old widow Inger Christensen, one lodger and one maid.

Ditlev Gothard Monrad, who was Bishop of Lolland-Falster as well as an MP, was a resident in the building in 1853. Henrik Cacling, a renowned Politiken journalist and co-founder of Dansk Journalistforbund, resided in the apartment on the first floor in 1890.

20th century

The financier O. Severin was around theb turn of the century based in the building. The writer n Kjeld Abell was among the  resident of the building in around 1938.

Architecture
Gammel Strand 40 is constructed with four storeys over a walk-out basement and is five bays wide. It is constructed in red brick and stands on a granite plinth. A two-bay gateway is located in the right-hand side of the building. A commemorative plaque above the gate commemorates that Georg Carstensen lived in the building when he opened Tivoli Gardens. The facade is finished by a dentilated cornice. A side wing, six bays long plus a canted bay in each end, projects from the rear side of the building and connects to a small two-bay rear wing in the other end.

References

External links

Listed residential buildings in Copenhagen
Residential buildings completed in 1801
1801 establishments in Denmark
Commemorative plaques in Copenhagen